Ernst Stadler (11 August 1883 — 30 October 1914) was a German Expressionist poet. He was born in Colmar, Alsace-Lorraine and educated in Strasbourg and Oxford; in 1906 he was awarded a Rhodes Scholarship to study at Magdalen College, Oxford.

His early verse was influenced by Stefan George and Charles Péguy, but after 1911, Stadler began developing a different style. His most important volume of poetry, Der Aufbruch, which appeared during 1914, is regarded as a major work of early Expressionism. The poems of Der Aufbruch are a celebration of the poet's joy in life and are written in long, free verse lines inspired by the example of Walt Whitman.

Stadler was killed in battle at Zandvoorde near Ypres in the early months of World War I.

Sources
Ernst Stadler Der Aufbruch (ed. Heinze Rölleke, Reclam, 1967)
Gedichte des Expressionismus (ed. Dietrich Bode, Reclam, 1966)

Notes

External links

 
 
 

1883 births
1914 deaths
People from Colmar
People from Alsace-Lorraine
Expressionist poets
Writers from Grand Est
German male poets
20th-century German poets
20th-century German male writers
German Rhodes Scholars
German military personnel killed in World War I